Martin Andrew Souter (born 19 February 1976) is an English cricketer.  Souter is a right-handed batsman who bowls right-arm medium pace.  He was born in Guildford, Surrey.

Souter was schooled at Charterhouse and Durham University. While studying for his degree, Souter made his only first-class appearance for Durham UCCE against Durham in 2002.  In this match, he was dismissed for a single run in the university's first-innings by Steve Harmison, while with the ball he took the wicket of Gary Pratt in Durham's first-innings for the cost of 54 runs from 12 overs, while in their second-innings he bowled 8 wicket-less overs for the cost of 29 runs.

References

External links
Martin Souter at ESPNcricinfo
Martin Souter at CricketArchive

1976 births
Living people
Sportspeople from Guildford
English cricketers
Durham MCCU cricketers
People educated at Charterhouse School
Alumni of Trevelyan College, Durham